10 Saxophones and 2 Basses is an album by composer, arranger and conductor Pete Rugolo featuring performances recorded in 1961 and first released on the Mercury label as part of its audiophile Perfect Presence Sound Series.

Reception

The Allmusic review by  noted:

Track listing
 "Skyliner" (Charlie Barnet) - 3:15
 "Sophisticated Lady" (Duke Ellington, Mitchell Parish, Irving Mills) - 4:33
 "How High the Moon" (Morgan Lewis, Nancy Hamilton) - 1:44
 "Saxophobia" (Rudy Wiedoeft) - 2:02
 "Holiday for Strings" (David Rose) - 2:43
 "Reed Rapture" (Stan Kenton) - 2:52
 "Sometimes I'm Happy" (Vincent Youmans, Irving Caesar) - 3:08
 "Contrasts" (Jimmy Dorsey) - 3:03
 "Medley: Four Brothers/Early Autumn" (Jimmy Guiffre/Ralph Burns, Woody Herman, Johnny Mercer) - 3:32
 "Come Back to Sorrento" (Ernesto De Curtis) - 3:02
 "Guy Meets Freddie Meets Billy" (Pete Rugolo) - 2:06
 "Funky Basses" (Rugolo) - 2:03
Recorded at United Recording Studios, Hollywood, CA on November 8, 1961 (tracks 1-4, 6, 7, 9 & 11), and November 9, 1961 (tracks 5, 8, 10 & 12).

Personnel
Pete Rugolo - arranger, conductor
Russ Cheever - soprano saxophone, C melody saxophone (tracks 1-11)
Gus Bivona, Skeets Herfurt, Bud Shank - alto saxophone (tracks 1-11)
Gene Cipriano, Bob Cooper, Plas Johnson - tenor saxophone (tracks 1-11)
Bill Perkins - tenor saxophone, baritone saxophone (tracks 1-11)
Chuck Gentry, Bill Hood - baritone saxophone, bass saxophone (tracks 1-11)
Jimmy Rowles - piano
Howard Roberts - guitar, banjo
Red Mitchell, Joe Mondragon - bass
Shelly Manne - drums

References

Pete Rugolo albums
1962 albums
Mercury Records albums
Albums arranged by Pete Rugolo
Albums conducted by Pete Rugolo